The Plottier Formation is a geologic formation that outcrops in the Argentine Patagonian provinces of Río Negro and Neuquén. It is the younger of two formations belonging to the Río Neuquén Subgroup within the Neuquén Group of the Neuquén Basin, with the oldest rocks dating from the late Coniacian and its youngest maybe from the very start of the Santonian. Formerly, that subgroup was treated as a formation, and the Plottier Formation was known as the Plottier Member.

Description 
A section near the Neuquén City airport, north of the town of Plottier, is the type locality of the Plottier Formation. At its base, this formation grades into the Portezuelo Formation, and it is in turn overlain conformably by the Bajo de la Carpa Formation, a unit of the Río Colorado Subgroup.

The Plottier Formation is the thinnest formation within the Neuquén Group, with a maximum thickness of only . It is differentiated from the underlying Portezuelo Formation primarily by its higher content of argillites (mud deposits) and was deposited under fluvial conditions. In 2006, a detailed lithostratigraphic and paleoecological study of a section of the Plottier Formation was published. This section contained alluvial deposits laid down by what was essentially a low-gradient wandering river throughout the millions of years, but often was of a single-channel type with little meandering.

Fossil content 
Few animal fossils are known from this formation, including:
 Titanosaurid sauropods (including "Antarctosaurus" giganteus, Petrobrasaurus puestohernandezi, Muyelensaurus pecheni and Notocolossus gonzalezparejasi)
 A large basal coelurosaurian theropod
 An azhdarchid pterosaur, Thanatosdrakon amaru
 chelid turtles Linderochelys rinconensis and Rionegrochelys caldieroi
 Abelisauridae
 Unenlagiinae
 Ornithopoda
 Aeolosaurini
 Saltasauridae
 Mesoeucrocodylia
 Crocodyliformes
 Ichnofossils
 Scoyenia sp.
 Taenidium sp.
 at least one mammal

There are also ichnofossils left on the river's mudflats, as well as fossil freshwater bivalves.

See also 
 List of fossil sites
 List of dinosaur bearing rock formations

References

Bibliography 
  (1993): Enantiornithine (Aves) Tarsometatarsi from the Cretaceous Lecho Formation of Northwestern Argentina. American Museum Novitates 3083: 1-27. [English with Spanish abstract] PDF fulltext
  (2002): Bird footprints from the Anacleto Formation (Late Cretaceous), Neuquén, Argentina. Ameghiniana 39(4): 453-463. [English with Spanish abstract] PDF fulltext
 
 
  (2006): Bird tracks from Liaoning Province, China: New insights into avian evolution during the Jurassic-Cretaceous transition. Cretaceous Research 27(1): 33-43.  (HTML abstract). Erratum: 
  (2005): Osteology of the sauropod embryos from the Upper Cretaceous of Patagonia. Acta Palaeontologica Polonica 50(1): 79–92. PDF fulltext

Further reading 

 A. B. Arcucci, L. S. Filippi, and J. O. Calvo. 2011. Un nuevo Mesoeucrocodylia Cretácio del norte de la Cuenca Neuquina, Argentina [A new Cretaceous Mesoeucrocodylia from the north of the Neuquen Basin, Argentina]. Revista Brasileira de Paleontologia 14(1):51-60
  L. S. Filippi, J. I. Canudo, J. L. Salgado, A. Garrido, R. García, I. Cerda, and A. Otero. 2011. A new sauropod titanosaur from the Plottier Formation (Upper Cretaceous) of Patagonia (Argentina). Geologica Acta 9(1):1-12
 B. J. González Riga, M. C. Lamanna, L. D. Ortiz David, J. O. Calvo, and J. P. Coria. 2016. A gigantic new dinosaur from Argentina and the evolution of the sauropod hind foot. Scientific Reports 6:19165:1-15

Geologic formations of Argentina
Neuquén Group
Upper Cretaceous Series of South America
Cretaceous Argentina
Coniacian Stage
Shale formations
Sandstone formations
Alluvial deposits
Fluvial deposits
Fossiliferous stratigraphic units of South America
Paleontology in Argentina
Geology of Neuquén Province
Geology of Río Negro Province